The Open Mahou de Madrid was a men's professional golf tournament on the Challenge Tour from 2005 to 2007.

There is also a Madrid Open on the European Tour.

Tournament hosts
2007 – Casino Club de Golf Retamares
2006 – Club de Golf La Herreria
2005 – Club de Golf La Herreria

Winners

Notes

External links
Coverage on the Challenge Tour's official site

Golf tournaments in Spain
Former Challenge Tour events
Sports competitions in Madrid